A Dog in a Drawer ( / Kuche v chekmedzhe) is a Bulgarian comedy-drama film released in 1982, directed by Dimitar Petrov, starring Veselin Prahov, Martin Stoyanov and Ruzha Delcheva.

This is the first of a series of hit movies starring the child actor Veselin Prahov which turned him into a star of the Bulgarian cinema from the 1980s. A Dog in a Drawer successfully carries on the popular in Bulgaria "Childhood genre", developed in the 1970s by Mormarevi Brothers together with the present director Dimitar Petrov. The film won first prize at the “Varna Film Fest 1982” as well as an award from the “Union of the Bulgarian Writers” for the screenplay by Rada Moskova who is also the writer of the next in the series On the Top of the Cherry Tree (1984).

Cast
In the roles of the children are:
Veselin Prahov as Dimitar Mitashki
Martin Stoyanov as Andro 
Emil Dimitrov as Stefo
Lyudmila Filipova
Evgeniya Genova
Aleksandrina Pendichanska
Rositsa Stoycheva
Ani Petrova

In the roles of the adults are:
Ruzha Delcheva as Andro's grandmother
Zhivko Garvanov as Stefo's father
Stefan Iliev as Mitashki's father
Ivan Yanchev as Mitashki's grandfather
Pavel Popandov as a dog trader, the bad guy
Aneta Sotirova as Andro's mother
Maria Kavardzhikova
Nadya Todorova as Dacheva

References

Sources

External links
 
 A Dog in a Drawer at the Bulgarian National Television 

1980s Bulgarian-language films
1982 films
1982 comedy-drama films
Films directed by Dimitar Petrov
Bulgarian comedy-drama films
Films set in Bulgaria
Films shot in Bulgaria